Bathymermis is a genus of nematodes belonging to the family Mermithidae.

Species:
 Bathymermis brevicauda Rubzov, 1972 
 Bathymermis fuhrmani Daday, 1911

References

Mermithidae